Harrah's Lake Tahoe is a hotel and casino in Stateline, Nevada. Harrah's is branded with the name of its former owner and operator William F. Harrah. It is now owned by Vici Properties and operated by Caesars Entertainment. The 18-story tower and 512 rooms, plus  casino make it one of the largest resorts at South Lake Tahoe.

History
Harrah's was first established in Lake Tahoe when William F. Harrah purchased George's Gateway Club in January 1955, for $500,000. Harrah’s Lake Club opened on June 20, 1955, which it is now Harveys Lake Tahoe.

In 1956, Harrah’s Lake Club was sold for $5.25 million in cash to Harvey Gross, which at the time was the most expensive casino purchase ever. In 1958, Bill Harrah acquired an interest in the Stateline Country Club and Nevada Club across the street (Harrah's current location) and opened Harrah's Stateline Club.

Also in 1956, a new radio station, KOWL, had its original radio studio inside the Harrah's Stateline Club. They were located on the upper floor. The station's transmitter and broadcast tower were roughly two miles south of the casino in South Lake Tahoe, California.

The South Shore Room opened in 1959, at a cost of $3.5 million. This 750-seat showroom, whose opening act was comedian Red Skelton, made entertainment a priority at Harrah's.

In 1962, Harrah's interiors were used for the Curtis Enterprises and Universal-International Pictures film 40 Pounds of Trouble, starring Tony Curtis, Suzanne Pleshette and Phil Silvers. The comedy film was about a gambler who dies and leaves his daughter in the hands of the casino's manager. The film had its premiere on January 19, 1963 at Harrah's South Shore Room, which Curtis and his wife Christine Kaufmann attended.

In 1963, Barry Keenan, Joseph Amsler and John Irwin abducted Frank Sinatra Jr., the 19-year-old son of singer Frank Sinatra, after his performance at the South Shore Room opening for George Jessel.

Portions of the Bette Midler film Jinxed! were shot on location at Harrah's in the summer of 1981 for the summer 1982 release of the film. Other locations used in the film were Harrah's in Reno, and the Harrah's Auto Museum, also in Reno.

Harrah had been planning to build a hotel at Lake Tahoe for many years, but had been hindered by costs. However, in 1971, when Harrah's went public, he finally had the finances available to build his dream hotel. In 1972, Harrah broke ground on his $25-million, 18-story, 250-room hotel which opened on November 9, 1973. Each  room was furnished with a fully stocked bar, bay windows, 2 bathrooms with TVs and telephones. It earned the first five-star diamond rating in casino history. The 20 story pre-cast concrete sculpted building facade was designed and constructed by Thomas J.Geever.

The hotel was later expanded with 290 additional rooms in 1976.

The hotel and casino were damaged on August 27, 1980, when a bomb planted by terrorist and extortionist John Birges across the street in Harveys Lake Tahoe exploded, destroying the neighboring casino. Harrah's, which was connected to Harvey's via a tunnel, suffered damage from the explosion, mostly from shattered windows. No one was injured in the explosion and both casinos were empty when the bomb detonated.

In 2000, it completed a $26 million renovation to update the casino, hotel rooms and restaurants on the 18th floor including the Forest Buffet and Friday’s Station.

On December 3, 2005, a shootout occurred in a private booth near the casino floor. One person was killed and two Douglas County Sheriff's Deputies were injured.

Caesars Entertainment began a major effort to remodel and revitalize Harrah's Lake Tahoe beginning in 2005; they remodeled floors 12 to 15 of the hotel and remade the rooms in mini suites with large couches, dry bars and brand new decor and furniture. The remodel was completed in mid-2006. Following the hotel remodel, Caesars completely remodeled the hotel's lobby and added a food court and luxury diamond outlet signature to Caesars called "Park Place Jewelers" in 2007. In 2008, Caesars added an upscale, luxury Chinese/Cantonese restaurant called "Gi Fu Loh" to cater to their Asian customers.

On October 6, 2017, ownership of the property was transferred to Vici Properties as part of a corporate spin-off, and it was leased back to Caesars Entertainment.

There is access to Harveys via an underground pathway that features an arcade and live acts at Sammy Hagar's CaboWabo.

References

 Mandel, Leon (1981). William Fisk Harrah – The Life And Times Of A Gambling Magnate. Doubleday & Company, Inc. .

External links
 

1955 establishments in Nevada
Casino hotels
Caesars Entertainment
Casinos completed in 1955
Casinos in Stateline, Nevada
Harrah's Entertainment
Hotel buildings completed in 1955
Hotels established in 1955
Hotels in Stateline, Nevada
Resorts in Nevada